WIIC-LD, virtual and UHF digital channel 31, is a low-powered Rev'n-affiliated television station licensed to Pittsburgh, Pennsylvania, United States. The station is owned by Abacus Television, and broadcasts from WQED's antenna tower in the Oakland section of Pittsburgh.

History
WIIC was originally an affiliate of The Box. After The Box was purchased by Viacom in 2001, WIIC became an affiliate of MTV2. In 2001, it would also simulcast Live Auction Television, a program that aired on its sister station, WBYD-CA (channel 39).

After leaving MTV2, WIIC-LP aired programming from NOYZ, a hybrid music/text messaging channel, until the station went silent in late 2007. NOYZ ceased operations a few months later. The station's license was initially canceled in 2010, but Abacus Television Network filed a petition of reconsideration, and the WIIC-LP license was reinstated in Fall 2011.

In 2014, WIIC went silent due to financial problems. In May 2015, it returned to the air, initially re-broadcasting HSN programming from WOSC-CD (channel 61). In August 2015, WIIC became a Bounce TV affiliate.

At some point after late 2015, channel 31 went silent and in early 2020, returned to the air, with three sub-channels: Rev'n, The Action Channel, and The Family Channel.

Callsign
The call sign WIIC-LD is a reference to the city's longtime NBC affiliate WPXI (channel 11), whose callsign was WIIC-TV from 1957 to 1981.

Digital channels
The station's digital signal is multiplexed:

See also
 WBYD-CD
 WSSS-LP

References

External links

Bounce TV affiliates
IIC-LD
Television channels and stations established in 1999
1999 establishments in Pennsylvania
Low-power television stations in the United States